Dynein light chain 2, cytoplasmic is a protein that in humans is encoded by the DYNLL2 gene.

Interactions
DYNLL2 has been shown to interact with DLG4, C12orf40, DLGAP1, MYO5A and BMF.

References

Further reading

External links